Fergus (Royland Field) Aerodrome, formerly , is a defunct airport that was located  north of Fergus, Ontario, Canada.

See also
List of airports in the Fergus area

References

Defunct airports in Ontario
Centre Wellington

pms:Fergus (Juergensen Field) Airport